The Blaireau Case (French:L'affaire Blaireau) is a 1932 French comedy drama film directed by Henry Wulschleger and starring Bach, Alice Tissot and Charles Montel.

Cast
 Bach as Blaireau  
 Alice Tissot as Mademoiselle de Hautperthuis  
 Charles Montel as Taupin  
 Renée Passeur as Mademoiselle de Charville 
 Pierre Juvenet as Le maire  
 Georges Tréville as Le baron de Hautperthuis  
 Jean-Louis Allibert as Maître Guilloche  
 Jean Fabert 
 Albert Broquin 
 Édouard Hardoux 
 Georges Despaux 
 Achille Defrenne 
 Roger Gaillard 
 Émile Saint-Ober 
 Marcel Lesieur
 Paul Franceschi 
 J.P. Martin
 Blanche Montel

See also
 The Blaireau Case (1923)
 Neither Seen Nor Recognized (1958)

References

Bibliography 
 Crisp, Colin. French Cinema—A Critical Filmography: Volume 1, 1929–1939. Indiana University Press, 2015.

External links 
 

1932 films
1930s French-language films
Films directed by Henry Wulschleger
Remakes of French films
Sound film remakes of silent films
French films based on plays
Films scored by Casimir Oberfeld
French black-and-white films
French comedy-drama films
1932 comedy-drama films
1930s French films